"Last Horizon" is a guitar solo written by Queen's guitarist Brian May. It is a slow, poignant solo, with a sad tone.

Overview
The record was released on December 6, 1993 as a single from its parent album, Back to the Light, and remained on the UK charts for two weeks, peaking at number 51. The b-sides of the single included live tracks that were later released on the album Live at the Brixton Academy.

May plays the composition at every one of his concerts since then (including the Queen + Paul Rodgers and Queen + Adam Lambert tours). "Last Horizon" was included on the live albums Return of the Champions and Live in Ukraine.

Track listing
7-inch single
"Last Horizon" (album version) – 4:10  
"'39" / "Let Your Heart Rule Your Head" (live version) – 4:22

CD single
"Last Horizon" (radio edit) – 3:06  
"Last Horizon" (live version) – 3:14 
"We Will Rock You" (live version) – 4:46
'Last Horizon" (album version) – 4:10

Personnel
Co-producer, engineer – Justin Shirley-Smith 
Design – Richard Gray
Producer, cover, concept – Brian May

References

External links 
 

1993 singles
Parlophone singles
Songs written by Brian May
Brian May songs
Hollywood Records singles
1993 songs
1990s instrumentals